The 1921 Hornsey by-election was held on 10 November 1921.  The by-election was held due to the death of the incumbent Unionist MP, Kennedy Jones.  It was won by the Unionist candidate William Ward.

References

Hornsey by-election
Hornsey,1921
Hornsey by-election
Hornsey,1921
Political history of Middlesex
20th century in Middlesex
Hornsey